St. Mary's High School is a private Catholic school located in the oasis of Mount Abu in the Aravalli Range of Rajasthan in western India. The school is operated by the Irish Christian Brothers and it accepts boys for both day and boarding. It falls under the Roman Catholic Diocese of Ajmer.

Due to the cold climate, the scholastic year usually runs from March to November.  Education begins from grade three and ends at grade ten with a centralized ICSE board exam. The Students come from various parts of the country and the world to be part of the school's renowned culture and history of producing promising products for the future.

The school opened in 1887 as Mount Abu Railway School. Upon takeover by the Christian Brothers in 1929, it was renamed St Mary's. The school is situated away from the city, surrounded by jungle and as such provides a calm environment for the students. It has a dam close by known as the Lower Kodhra Dam. For sporting activities the school has six football pitches, three volleyball courts and four basketball courts. It also has an indoor gym and a swimming pool.

School Principal List
 1984 - Br Christopher
 1988 - Br D'Cruz
 1990 - Br Sarto D'souza

The school has 6 Playgrounds, 2 volleyball courts, 4 basketball courts. Common games played are Cricket, Hockey, Football, Volleyball, Basketball

References

Congregation of Christian Brothers secondary schools
Catholic secondary schools in India
Catholic boarding schools in India
Schools in Colonial India
Christian schools in Rajasthan
High schools and secondary schools in Rajasthan
Boarding schools in Rajasthan
Education in Sirohi district
Mount Abu
Educational institutions established in 1887
1887 establishments in India